The men's 4 × 100 metres relay event at the 1967 Summer Universiade was held at the National Olympic Stadium in Tokyo on 31 August and 4 September 1967.

Results

Heats

Final

References

Athletics at the 1967 Summer Universiade
1967